Yahya Yahya Al-Mutawakel (born 25 September 1959) is a professor of economics at Sana'a University who served as Minister of Industry and Trade in the Cabinet of Yemen from 2007 to 2011. 

Born in Sana'a, he was educated at Sana'a University (BA Economics & Political Science, 1982) and the University of Maryland, College Park (MA Economics, 1986), and completed his PhD in 1992 at the University of East Anglia entitled "Import substitution as an industrial strategy in the Yemen Arab Republic". His experience includes work for the World Bank and United Nations.

References

1959 births
Living people
Sanaa University alumni
University of Maryland, College Park alumni
Alumni of the University of East Anglia
Academic staff of Sanaa University
21st-century Yemeni politicians
Industry and trade ministers of Yemen